The fourth season of The Hills, an American reality television series, consists of 20 episodes and was broadcast on MTV. It aired from August 18, 2008, until December 22, 2008. The season was filmed from April to December of 2008 in Los Angeles, California, with additional footage in New York City, New York; Las Vegas, Nevada; Italy; and Cabo San Lucas, Mexico. The executive producer was Liz Gateley.

The Hills focuses on the lives of Lauren Conrad, Audrina Patridge, Whitney Port, and Heidi Montag. During the season, Conrad's distaste for Montag's boyfriend Spencer Pratt continues to inhibit reconciliation between the women. Meanwhile, Patridge is concerned that her new housemate Lo Bosworth is straining her relationship with Conrad. The season finale saw Port relocate to New York City to accept employment with Diane von Fürstenberg, while Montag and Pratt elope.

Upon the conclusion of the season, Port was commissioned her own spin-off series The City, which originally chronicled the lives of her and friends Olivia Palermo, Jay Lyon, Erin Lucas, and Adam Senn. Additionally, rumors were widespread that Conrad wished to leave the series to pursue other career opportunities, though she made her final appearance on the series during the mid-season finale of the following season.

Synopsis
The fourth season continues as tension builds between housemates Lauren Conrad, Audrina Patridge, and Lo Bosworth. Patridge expresses concern that Bosworth is becoming a distancing factor between herself and Conrad. Before Patridge moves into a separate residence, the women tearfully mend their friendship. However, their friendship is briefly strained after Patridge hears false speculation that Conrad was involved with her on-again/off-again boyfriend Justin Brescia. Conrad became involved in a romantic relationship with her former boyfriend Doug Reinhardt, though the pair eventually separated and instead became friends.

As part of her duties with Kelly Cutrone's PR firm People's Revolution, Whitney Port finds herself often travelling to New York City and living a bi-coastal lifestyle. She eventually moves to the city after receiving employment with Diane von Fürstenberg, at which point she is commissioned her own spin-off series The City.

Meanwhile, to the dismay of her boyfriend Spencer Pratt, Heidi Montag allows her sister Holly to temporarily live with them after moving from their hometown of Crested Butte, Colorado. Pratt eventually convinces Heidi to ask Holly to find another residence. In celebration of her absence, he visits Montag at her work event with Bolthouse Productions, where she is terminated after becoming visibly intoxicated. However, Pratt later becomes enraged after Conrad and Bosworth welcome Holly to stay with them, as he and Montag were still feuding with the former regarding earlier sex tape rumors. Afterwards, Pratt surprises Montag with a vacation to Cabo San Lucas, where they decide to elope. Upon returning to Los Angeles, Conrad and Montag appear to come to common terms and become friends again out of spite of suspicions over Spencer. The season concludes as Pratt chooses not to legalize their marriage after deciding to gift Montag with her dream wedding.

Cast

All four main cast members retain their positions during the fourth season of the series. Lauren Conrad serves as the series' narrator and focal point, and continues to attend the Fashion Institute of Design & Merchandising (FIDM). Along with her friend Whitney Port, she remains employed by Kelly Cutrone's PR firm People's Revolution. Audrina Patridge is housemates with Conrad, and works for Epic Records. Heidi Montag remains estranged with her former friends Conrad and Patridge, and is employed by event planning company Bolthouse Productions.

The aforementioned women's storylines were largely developed by a number of supporting cast members. Lo Bosworth is Conrad's best friend and third housemate, though Patridge sees her as a distancing factor in her friendship with Conrad. Justin Brescia, nicknamed "Justin Bobby" by Bosworth, returns as Patridge's on-again/off-again boyfriend. Brody Jenner, Frankie Delgado, and Doug Reinhardt are mutual friends with the majority of the cast. Having dated during their teenage years, Reinhardt also briefly dated Conrad in the beginning of the season.

Montag and her boyfriend Spencer Pratt are disliked by the majority of the cast, who look to disassociate themselves with the couple's antagonistic antics. However, Conrad is friends with their sisters Holly Montag and Stephanie Pratt, through whom Montag attempts to revive their friendship. In the workplace, Cutrone is featured as Conrad and Port's boss, while Brent Bolthouse serves as Montag's boss. Kimberly Brandon and Chiara Kramer are shown as Montag and Patridge's respective co-workers and friends.

Episodes

References

4
2008 American television seasons